Otesha Luletta Charles (born 14 September 1993) is a Guyanese footballer who plays as a forward for English club Gillingham. She has been a member of the Guyana women's national team.

Career 
In 2016, she joined Watford F.C. Ladies. Charles joined Gillingham in 2020.

Personal life 
Charles was born in Guyana, moving to England when she was 7. She has dual citizenship between Guyana and the UK, and owns a hair salon in Peckham, south London.

International goals
Scores and results list Guyana's goal tally first

References

1993 births
Living people
Women's association football forwards
Guyanese women's footballers
Guyana women's international footballers
Millwall Lionesses L.F.C. players
Leyton Orient F.C. players
Guyanese expatriate footballers
Guyanese expatriate sportspeople in England
Expatriate women's footballers in England